Yuldong Park (율동공원) is a park located at Yul-dong, Bundang-gu, Seongnam, South Korea. Yuldong Park has many trails where visitors can get away from the city environment.

History 
Yuldong Park opened on September 1, 1999 as a resting place for Bundang residents with many entertainment facilities.

Visitors attractions 
Yuldong Park  has a bungee jumping site (45m), a large fountain that spurts water up to a height of 103 meters, and many other novel things to see. Surrounding the reservoir, the park is well equipped with a promenade, a theater, flower gardens, children's park, badminton center, artificial rock wall, and many spots for a family picnic. A walking path and bicycle path circle the reservoir. On weekends, many people picnic, jog and walk. There are many nearby restaurants.

St. John's Cathedral is close to the Yuldong Park.

The park is across the street from Bundang-dong which has quiet restaurants and cafés.

References 

Bundang
Parks in Gyeonggi Province